Col. George Arbuthnot of Norton Court, Gloucester, DL JP MP (9 January 1836 – 26 December 1912) was a British politician.

Life
Born in Madras, British India, he was the son of John Alves Arbuthnot of Coworth Park, Old Windsor, Sunningdale, Berkshire, and wife and cousin Mary Arbuthnot.

Arbuthnot was Member of Parliament for Hereford from 1871 to 1874 and from 1878 to 1880. He served in the Royal Horse Artillery, reaching the rank of colonel, and was Justice of Peace of Herefordshire and Gloucestershire, and Deputy Lieutenant for Herefordshire.

He was buried with his wife at Holy Trinity Churchyard, Sunningdale, Berkshire.

Family
On 12 October 1870 he married Caroline Emma Nepean Aitchison (Norwood, London, 1848 – 16 March 1927), daughter of Captain Andrew Nepean Aitchison (Bombay, 13 June 1816, bap. Bombay, 3 August 1816, – Cairo, Egypt, 1 April 1850), 13th Natal Infantry, Honorable East India Company Service, brother of General Charles Terrington Aitchison, and wife (m. Byculla, Bombay, 20 January 1842) Frances Matilda Farish, daughter of James Farish, and paternal granddaughter of Major General Andrew Aitchison of Ryde, Isle of Wight (? – Hastings, East Sussex, 29 February 1848) and wife Martha Charlotte .... They had six children: 
 Frances Muriel Arbuthnot (London, 22 November 1871 – 7 September 1933), married firstly on 6 July 1910 to Stephen Karl J. Brichta (? – 19 October 1929), son of Philip Brichta, and married secondly in 1929 to Gilbert Amos Reeve (?–1971), who was in the Indian Police
 Maj. John Bernard Arbuthnot (London, 17 May 1875 – 16 September 1950)
 Dorothy Gertrude Arbuthnot (London, 20 January 1878 – 25 April 1957), married on 3 February 1904 Brigadier-General Hugh Frederick Bateman-Champain (? – 7 October 1933), and had female issue
 Mary Christobel Arbuthnot (London, 12 September 1879 – ?), married firstly on 23 October 1907 George Archibald Wallace Young, son of Archibald Young of Wellington House, Lancashire, and had one son, married secondly on 3 June 1914 Alexander Gifford Ludford-Astley, Captain of the 14th King's Hussars, who was killed in action in the First World War in Mesopotamia on 5 March 1917, son of The Rev. Benjamin Buckler Gifford Ludford-Astley, JP, Master of Arts (MA), Justice of the Peace and Rector at Cadeby, Leicestershire, without issue, and married thirdly on 27 April 1922 Edgar James Brydges, MC (? – 8 January 1960), Colonel of the 14th King's Hussars, Military Cross, son of John Henry Brydges of The Court, Eastbourne, Sussex, and of Fedderate, Aberdeenshire, without issue:
 Peter Leslie Young, married firstly to Pamela Clare Gaitskell (married thirdly to Hugo Darling Dent), and had one son, married secondly to Doreen ... (formerly Duff), without issue, and married thirdly to Joan Laing (formerly Barnes and Richardson), without issue:
 Michael Arbuthnot Young (5 November 1930), married on 2 April 1966 to Susanna Elizabeth Barclay (18 December 1940), daughter of Theodore David Barclay, Chairman of Barclays Bank plc, and had two sons:
 Christopher Young
 Mary Young
 Hugh Archibald Arbuthnot (4 December 1885 – 28 December 1950), married firstly in 1917 and divorced in 1928 Mabel Eleanor Jackson, daughter of Henry Jackson, without issue, and married secondly on 24 October 1928 Margaret Anne Reid (3 January 1895 – Croydon, London, 29 January 1961), daughter of Andrew Reid, comedian and house decorator, and wife Annie Brown Scott, without issue
 Ronald George Urquhart Arbuthnot (London, 8 October 1891 – killed while flying on active service in the First World War on 3 December 1918, buried at Shenley, Hertfordshire), Lieutenant of the 16th Lancers and in the Royal Air Force.

References

External links
 
 
 
 

Politicians from Chennai
1836 births
Members of the Parliament of the United Kingdom for English constituencies
UK MPs 1868–1874
UK MPs 1874–1880
George Arbuthnot
Deputy Lieutenants of Herefordshire
Royal Horse Artillery officers
People from Sunningdale
1912 deaths